Boronia barkeriana, commonly known as Barker's boronia, is a plant in the citrus family, Rutaceae and is endemic to eastern Australia. It is a shrub with ground-hugging branches, simple, toothed leaves and bright pink, four-petalled flowers.

Description
The leaves have small teeth on the edge and are often reddish along the edges and undersides. The eight stamens have hairy edges.

Taxonomy and naming
Boronia barkeriana was first formally described in 1880 by Ferdinand von Mueller and the description was published in Fragmenta phytographiae Australiae from a specimen collected by "Mrs. C.A. Barker" near Mount Wilson.

There are three subspecies:

Distribution and habitat
This boronia grows in moist places on sandstone.
 Subspecies angustifolia mainly grows in Morton and Budderoo National Parks 
 Subspecies barkeriana grows on the coast and ranges near Braidwood.
 Subspecies gymnopetala is only known from the area between Port Jackson and Waterfall but has not been collected since 1923 and is presumed extinct.

References

barkeriana
Flora of New South Wales
Plants described in 1880
Taxa named by Ferdinand von Mueller